HC Kremenchuk is an ice hockey team based in Kremenchuk, Ukraine, playing in the Ukrainian Hockey Extra League that was formed prior to the 2016–17 season. The club was founded in 2010 and initially competed in Ukrainian amateur championships before joining the Belarusian Vysshaya Liga for 2013–14 season. After finishing the regular 2013–14 season Kremenchuk was forced to withdraw from the league prior to the playoffs due to the political situation in Ukraine. The team then joined the Ukrainian Championship for the 2014–15 season, winning the regular season and finishing as runners-up in the playoffs. Kremenchuk has also qualified for the IIHF Continental Cup on one occasion.

History
HC Kremenchuk was founded in June 2010 and initially competed in Ukrainian amateur championships where they won three titles. In February 2012 the club moved into the newly built Aisberg Arena which has a seating capacity of 3100. Before the start of the 2012–13 season Kremenchuk put together a team of under-18 players to compete in the Belarusian under-18 league. HK Kremenchuk U18 finished their debut season in second place, 15 points off league winners RCOP Raubichi U18. In 2013 HK Kremenchuk joined the Belarusian Vysshaya Liga for the start of the 2013–14 season. The team finished the regular season in sixth place however in February 2014 they were forced to withdraw from the league due to the political situation in Ukraine. Their under-18 club withdrew from the Belarusian under-18 league for the same reasons.

After withdrawing from the Vysshaya Liga HK Kremenchuk was admitted to the Ukrainian Hockey Championship for the start of the 2014–15 season. The team finished the regular season in first place, 15 points ahead of the second placed Generals Kiev. Going into the playoffs HK Kremenchuk was drawn against Vityaz Kharkiv for the semifinals. Kremenchuk won the series two games to one and advanced to the finals against ATEK Kiev. They opened the three game finals series with a 4–2 win over ATEK Kiev however lost the second and third game to be defeated one to game to two. In May 2015 it was announced that HK Kremenchuk had applied to participate in the 2015–16 IIHF Continental Cup after ATEK Kiev declined the invitation. Their application was accepted and the team were scheduled to enter in the third round. HK Kremenchuk was drawn in Group E of the third round against Dragons de Rouen, GKS Tychy and Shakhtyor Soligorsk. Kremenchuk finished the round-robin Group E tournament in fourth place and failed to qualify for the super final round of the tournament. Prior to the start of the 2015–16 season Kremenchuk joined the newly formed Ukrainian Hockey Extra League which replaced the Ukrainian Hockey Championship. Kremenchuk ended the regular season in third place, and was defeated by Generals Kiev in the semifinals.

In April 2018, club junior Gleb Krivoshapkin played for the Ukraine men's national under-18 ice hockey team (2018 IIHF World U18 Championship Division I B). He scored 2 goals against the Austrians. The next game he was injured.

Season by season results

Tournaments
2015–16 IIHF Continental Cup – 4th in Group E of the Third Round. Failed to advance.

Honours

Ukraine
  Ukrainian Hockey Championship Regular Season
  Winners (2): 2016–17, 2019–20
  Ukrainian Hockey Championship Trophy
  Winners (1): 2020

Players and personnel

Current roster
Team roster for the 2015–16 season

Head coaches
Olexander Savytsky, 2013–2014
Dmytro Pidgursky, 2014–present

General managers
Olexander Savytsky, 2014–present

Affiliated teams

HK Kremenchuk U18
In 2012 HK Kremenchuk put together a team of under-18 players to compete in the Belarusian under-18 league. HK Kremenchuk U18 finished their debut season in second place, 15 points off league winners RCOP Raubichi U18. Part way through their second season the Belarusian clubs announced they would no longer travel to matches in Ukraine due to the ongoing political situation. As a result, HK Kremenchuk U18 was forced to withdraw from the league and their remaining 14 games were counted as losses. The final standings saw the team finish in eighth place with 40 points. The team is currently not active after leaving the Belarusian under-18 league.

Season by season results

See also
 Ukraine men's national junior ice hockey team

References

External links
Official website 

2010 establishments in Ukraine
Ice hockey clubs established in 2010
Ice hockey teams in Ukraine
Sport in Kremenchuk